Harold Garrett Hunsperger (October 8, 1946 – February 26, 2005) was an All-Star Canadian football player who played for the BC Lions and Toronto Argonauts. Considered one of the strongest players in professional football, was a legitimate 500+ pound bench presser.  He played college football at Central Missouri State.

References

1946 births
2005 deaths
BC Lions players